Theophilus Bolton, D.D. (1678–1744) was an Anglican bishop in Ireland in the 17th century. He is known for establishing the Bolton Library.

He was born in County Mayo, and was the grandson of Richard Bolton, Lord Chancellor of Ireland from 1639 to 1648. He was educated at Trinity College Dublin, where he was elected a Scholar in 1695, and was ordained in 1703. He became Prebendary of Monmahenock in 1707; and Rector of St. Nicholas Without, Dublin in  1713. A contemporary of Jonathan Swift, he was appointed Vicar general to the Archbishop of Dublin in 1721 and Precentor of Christ Church Cathedral, Dublin in 1722. Also that year he became Chancellor of St Patrick's Cathedral, Dublin and Bishop of Clonfert and Kilmacduagh. He was translated to Elphin   in 1724 and finally to the Archbishopric of Cashel in 1730.

He died in post on 31 January 1744.

References

1678 births
1744 deaths
Alumni of Trinity College Dublin
Anglican archbishops of Cashel
Bishops of Clonfert and Kilmacduagh
Bishops of Elphin
Members of the Irish House of Lords
Religious leaders from County Mayo
Scholars of Trinity College Dublin
Irish Anglican archbishops